White Gold is a 2003 Russian action film directed by Viktor Ivanov from a screenplay by John Jopson and Viktor Ivanov. The story begins with the actual events of 1919 when a White Army train carrying the bulk of the Russian Empire's gold reserves arrives empty at Siberia's Irkutsk station. The adventure begins when, decades later, the grandson of a White Army officer inherits a map to the treasure.

External links

2003 films
2000s action adventure films
2000s Russian-language films
Russian action adventure films
Treasure hunt films